Silk Stockings is a 1927 American comedy film directed by Wesley Ruggles and written by Beatrice Van and Albert DeMond. It is based on the 1914 play A Pair of Silk Stockings by Cyril Harcourt. The film stars Laura La Plante, John Harron, Otis Harlan, William Austin, Marcella Daly and Heinie Conklin. The film was released on October 2, 1927, by Universal Pictures. The film survives.

Plot
Happily married, Sam and Molly Thornhill are still a very much in love couple but one of their favorite pastimes is fighting. On the eve of the wedding anniversary, Sam is forced to stop over at the office to discuss business with some clients. Pressed by his haste to get home as soon as possible, he does not notice that a lady has slipped a silk stocking into his suit pocket which, upon his return, is immediately discovered by Molly. She and George Bagnall, a friend of the family, learn that in another similar case, it ended in divorce. Judge Moore, their mutual friend, thinks it well to teach the two quarrelsome spouses a lesson and suggests that Molly get a divorce. Reluctantly, she agrees to separate from her husband. While the two are at the seaside, visiting friends, the young wife is unable to hide her unhappiness. Moore then tells her that the divorce petition would be immediately rejected if she and her husband were found together in an awkward situation. She then rushes into what she believes to be her husband's room, but instead finds herself in front of George and his fiancée. The situation is resolved with the arrival of Sam who will take his beloved wife in his arms, thus offering her the excuse to retrace his steps.

Cast        
Laura La Plante as Molly Thornhill
John Harron as Sam Thornhill
Otis Harlan as Judge Foster
William Austin as George Bagnall
Marcella Daly as Helen
Heinie Conklin as Watchman
Burr McIntosh as Judge
Tempe Pigott as Mrs. Gower
Ruth Cherrington as Dowager

References

External links
 

1927 films
1920s English-language films
Silent American comedy films
1927 comedy films
Universal Pictures films
Films directed by Wesley Ruggles
American silent feature films
American black-and-white films
1920s American films